Nine is an album by folk artist Tim Hardin, recorded in England and released in 1973. It was Hardin's final finished studio album.

Background 
After the termination of his contract with Columbia, Hardin signed with GM Records. He had previously attempted to record "Shiloh Town" during the aborted Nashville sessions in 1968. The song was based on a traditional song, recorded previously by Richie Havens. The track "Blues on My Ceiling" was erroneously credited to Hardin and "While You're on Your Way" and "Never Too Far" were re-workings of his songs from his first album. The album was his last complete studio recording and was not released in the US until 1976.

Nine was re-issued on CD on the See For Miles label in 1994 with extensive liner notes and the single "Judge and Jury".

Reception 

In his review for Allmusic, music critic Bruce Eder wrote "This proved to be Hardin's final finished studio album, and there is a real sense — for all of the thick electric band sounds all over this record — of someone singing his insides out. Some of what's here is a shadow of the kind of writing that he did a decade earlier, although none of it is dull or predictable... It's all surprisingly good listening, and that goes double for fans of Hardin, though they may also be disturbed by some of what they hear and read."

Track listing 
All tracks composed by Tim Hardin; except where indicated

Side one 
 "Shiloh Town" – 3:00
 "Never Too Far" – 3:05
 "Rags and Old Iron" (Oscar Brown, Norman Curtis) – 4:53
 "Look Our Love Over" – 5:01
 "Person to Person" (Andy Bown, Tim Hardin) – 3:48

Side two 
 "Darling Girl" (Michael d'Albuquerque) – 4:25
 "Blues on My Ceiling" (Fred Neil) – 3:05
 "Is There No Rest for the Weary" (Domenic Troiano) – 3:18
 "Fire and Rain" (James Taylor) – 4:37
 "While You're on Your Way" – 3:39
1994 re-issue bonus track:
 "Judge and Jury" – 3:22

Personnel 
Tim Hardin – vocals, guitar, keyboards
Peter Frampton – guitar on "Never Too Far" and "Rags and Old Iron"
Andy Bown – bass
Bob Cohen – guitar
Mike Driscoll – drums
Jimmy Horowitz – organ, arrangements, conductor; piano on "Person to Person"
David Katz – violin, strings
John Mealing – piano, electric piano
Liza Strike – background vocals
Sue Glover – background vocals
Madeline Bell – background vocals

Production notes 
Produced by Jimmy Horowitz
Engineered by Andy Knight and Hugh Jones
Mike Gill - art direction
Dave Field - sleeve design
Steve Campbell - photography

References 

1973 albums
Tim Hardin albums
Antilles Records albums
Albums recorded at IBC Studios